John Leckie is an English record producer and recording engineer.

References

Sources
 Ford, Simon. Hip Priest: The Story of Mark E.Smith and the Fall. London: Quartet Books, 2002. 

 
Production discographies